New Proton Bank was a commercial bank based in Athens, Greece. It had been established as a good bank, to which all deposits and sound assets of Proton Bank were transferred.

External links
 Official Website

References

Defunct banks of Greece
Banks established in 2011
Greek companies established in 2011